Laetitia Marie Laure Casta (born 11 May 1978) is a French model and actress.

Casta became a "GUESS? Girl" in 1993 and gained further recognition as a Victoria's Secret Angel from 1998 to 2000 and as a spokesperson for cosmetics company L'Oréal. She has appeared on over 250 covers of such popular magazines as Cosmopolitan, Vogue, Rolling Stone, Elle and Glamour, and has walked runways for designers such as Yves Saint Laurent, Jean-Paul Gaultier, Chanel, Dior, Dolce & Gabbana, Paco Rabanne, Kenzo, Louis Vuitton, Christian Lacroix, Roberto Cavalli, Jacquemus, Ralph Lauren and Vivienne Westwood.

Casta became an actress, appearing in such films as Gainsbourg: A Heroic Life (2010), in which she portrayed sex symbol Brigitte Bardot, Face (2009) and The Blue Bicycle (2000), as well as the play Ondine at the theatre Antoine.

Early life
Laetitia Casta was born in Pont-Audemer, Normandy. Her mother, Line Blin, is from Normandy. Her father, Dominique Casta, is from Corsica. Casta has an older brother, Jean-Baptiste, and a younger sister, Marie-Ange. She spent her childhood in Normandy and Corsica.

Career

Modeling 
Casta's modeling career reportedly began when she was discovered by the photographer Frederic Cresseaux, during a family holiday in her father's native Corsica, at age 15. After her unexpected registration by Jeeby, Casta was elected Miss Lumio 93.

Casta has been the L'Oréal Paris brand ambassador since 1998. She has been featured in Pantene, Guess?, Tommy Hilfiger, Valentino, Givenchy, Ralph Lauren, Cacharel, Lolita Lempicka, Chanel, Dolce and Gabbana, Nina Ricci, Swarovski, Yves Saint Laurent, Louis Vuitton, Roberto Cavalli, Jacquemus, J. Crew, Tiffany & Co., Loewe, Bvlgari, Giorgio Armani, H&M, Miu Miu, Pepe Jeans, Escada, Alberta Ferretti and XOXO ad campaigns. She has appeared on more than 250 magazine covers including Harper's Bazaar, Elle, Marie Claire, Glamour, Cosmopolitan, Vanity Fair, i-D, Rolling Stone and Vogue (Paris, España, Germany, Russia and Turkey). Casta was the last muse of fashion designer Yves Saint Laurent, serving as the bride in his fashion shows from 1998 to 2001. She walked down the annual Victoria's Secret Fashion Show in 1997, 1998, 1999, and 2000. She was one of the company's signature Victoria' Secret Angels from 1998 to 2000. She claims that her career with Victoria's Secret ended because she was "too much of [a] rebel". She also appeared in Sports Illustrated Swimsuit Issue three consecutive times, as well at the Pirelli Calendar 1999 by Herb Ritts, 2000 by Annie Leibovitz and 2019 by Albert Watson.

She is the face of fragrances Chanel's Allure, Givenchy's Forbidden flower, Lolita Lempicka's Lolita, Cacharel's Promise, Bulgari's BLV II, Ralph Lauren's Notorious, Yves Saint Laurent's Baby doll and Paris, Nina Ricci's L'Extase and D&G's Pour Femme. The Parisians could follow her Adventures in the Galeries Lafayette by Jean-Paul Goude. For Christmas 2011, Peter Lindbergh shot True Love, the very thought of Casta at the summit of Manhattan and between the snowy lions of marble of the New York Public Library for Tiffany & Co.
On 10 March 2010, in Paris, she opened the Louis Vuitton fall/winter 2010 fashion show. On 27 September 2010, she closed the Roberto Cavalli spring/summer 2011 fashion show in Milan. On 18 January 2020, in Paris, she opened Jacquemus fall/winter 2020 fashion show. In September 2020, Casta appeared in the fall/winter ad campaign for Yves Saint Laurent.

She was ranked as an "Industry Icon" by models.com, and is currently ranked as a "New Super".

Acting 
Her first role was as Falbala in Asterix & Obelix Take On Caesar directed by Claude Zidi, a live-action adaptation of the comic book Asterix, in which Obelix, portrayed by Gérard Depardieu, plays Casta's love interest. Casta appeared in Les Ames Fortes, directed by Raul Ruiz. Her performance as Brigitte Bardot in the movie Gainsbourg (Vie heroique) earned her a Cesar Award nomination. Casta served as a jury member at the 69th Venice International Film Festival in 2012.

Marianne controversy 
In 1999, Casta was ranked first in a national survey ordered by the French Mayors' Association to decide who should be the new model for the bust of Marianne, an allegorical symbol of the French Republic, which stands inside every French town hall. Casta became the focus of a controversy when, after being selected to be Marianne, newspapers in Britain and France reported that she had relocated to London where taxes on high earners are lower. Casta's father said she went to London for professional reasons; on a TV show, she also said that she rented a flat in London to be near her boyfriend. The French minister of the interior spoke about Casta on the radio; comparing the advantages of living in France with regard to the drawbacks of London after political opponents used Casta's relocation to London as an opportunity to criticise the government.

Political involvement
On 6 April 2008, Casta demonstrated in a White March of nonviolent protest to ask for the immediate release of Ingrid Betancourt, presidential candidate kidnapped since 2002 by the FARC.
On 30 April 2002, she attended the demonstration Vive la République after the first round election of the 2002 presidential election.

She was appointed as a UNICEF Goodwill Ambassador on 9 December 2016, committed to help the 250 million children living in conflict areas.

Personal life
On 19 October 2001, Casta gave birth to her daughter, whose father is the photographer Stephane Sednaoui. Casta was engaged to Italian actor Stefano Accorsi. The couple have two children.
In June 2017, Casta married her boyfriend of two years, French actor Louis Garrel. On 17 March 2021, Casta gave birth to her fourth child, the couple's first.

Laetitia has one quarter Italian ancestry from her father.

Filmography

Director, screenwriter, producer

Actress

Music videos

DVD and Blu-ray

Theatre

Humanitarian action

Awards and recognition

Books

See also

References

Further reading

External links 

  
 
 

1978 births
Living people
People from Eure
Chevaliers of the Ordre des Arts et des Lettres
French female models
French film actresses
French people of Corsican descent
French television actresses
21st-century French actresses
Victoria's Secret Angels